The current state flag of South Australia, was officially adopted by the government of South Australia in 1904.

The flag is based on the defaced British Blue Ensign with the state badge located in the fly.  The badge is a gold disc featuring a piping shrike with its wings outstretched. The badge is believed to have been originally designed by Robert Craig, a teacher at the School of Arts in Adelaide, and officially gazetted on 14 January 1904.

Previous flags
The first flag of South Australia was adopted in 1870.  It too was a defaced British Blue Ensign but with a black disc in the fly containing the Southern Cross and the two pointers (Alpha and Beta Centauri).

South Australia then adopted a second flag in 1876, also a Blue Ensign, with a new badge.  The badge design was an artistic rendition of the arrival of Britannia (a white woman in flowing garb and holding a shield, representing the new settlers) meeting an Aboriginal sitting with a spear on a rocky shoreline.  A kangaroo appears to be carved into the rocks behind the Aboriginal.  This flag was adopted after a request from the Colonial Office for a new design over the old one due to its similarity to the flags of New Zealand and Victoria.

Proposal for a new flag
On 29 October 2016, a motion to adopt a new, "more multicultural" state flag was passed at the South Australian Labor Party conference. The State Government did not act on this proposal before Labor lost office at the 2018 state election.

Governor's flag
The Governor of South Australia, being the representative of the South Australian head of state, the Queen of Australia, is officially granted a flag for use on all official occasions. It is identical in design and construction to the flag of South Australia, except that it features a St. Edward's Crown above the badge to represent vice-regal power.

See also 
Coat of arms of South Australia
List of Australian flags
Flags of the Governors of the Australian states

References

External links
 The State Flag of South Australia
 
 1870 flag

1904 establishments in Australia
Flags introduced in 1904
Emblems of South Australia
South Australia
South Australia
Society in South Australia
Flags displaying animals